This is a list of the first openly LGBT people to have held political office in the United States. No openly LGBT person has served as president or vice president of the United States or as a justice on the Supreme Court of the United States. However, all 50 states have elected openly LGBT people to political office in some capacity, and 48 states have elected openly LGBT people to either or both chambers of the state legislature.

A total of eight states and one territory have elected a total of twelve openly LGBT people to statewide or territorywide elected offices: Jared Polis (Governor of Colorado), Maura Healey (Governor of Massachusetts and former Attorney General of Massachusetts), Tina Kotek (Governor of Oregon), Kate Brown (former Governor of Oregon and former Secretary of State of Oregon), Tammy Baldwin (United States Senator from Wisconsin), Kyrsten Sinema (United States Senator from Arizona), Dana Nessel (Attorney General of Michigan), Kris Mayes (Attorney General of Arizona), Ricardo Lara (Insurance Commissioner of California), Kevin Lembo (Comptroller of Connecticut), Josh Tenorio (Lieutenant Governor of Guam), and Benjamin Cruz (Public Auditor of Guam).

A total of three of the ten most populous cities in the United States have elected a total of three openly LGBT people as mayor: Lori Lightfoot (Mayor of Chicago), Todd Gloria (Mayor of San Diego), and Annise Parker (former Mayor of Houston).

Federal

Congress

U.S. representative (first out congressperson and Democrat): Gerry Studds (MA-12, MA-10) – served 1973–1997, outed 1983
U.S. representative (first to voluntarily come out): Barney Frank (MA-4) – served 1980–2013, came out in 1987
U.S. representative (first out Republican): Steve Gunderson (WI-3) – served 1981–1997, outed 1994
U.S. representative (first Republican to voluntarily come out): Jim Kolbe (AZ-5) – served 1985–2007, came out 1996
U.S. representative (out when first elected, female): Tammy Baldwin (WI-2) – served 1999–2013
U.S. representative (out when first elected, male): Jared Polis (CO-2) – served 2009–2019
U.S. representative (out when first elected), first openly bisexual member of Congress: Kyrsten Sinema (AZ-9) – elected 2012
U.S. representative (out when first elected), first to succeed another openly gay officeholder in office: Mark Pocan (WI-2) – elected 2012, succeeded Tammy Baldwin
U.S. representative (out when first elected), first non-white and first Asian openly gay member of Congress: Mark Takano (CA-41) – elected 2012
U.S. representative (out when first elected), first Native American openly gay member of Congress: Sharice Davids (KS-3) – elected 2018
U.S. representative (out when first elected), first Black openly gay members of Congress: Mondaire Jones (NY-17) and Ritchie Torres (NY-15)  – elected 2020
U.S. representative (out when first elected), first Latino openly gay member of Congress: Ritchie Torres (NY-15) – elected 2020
U.S. Congressional committee chair: Gerry Studds – chair of House Committee on Merchant Marine and Fisheries 1992–1995
U.S. senator (out when first elected, first openly LGBT U.S. senator): Tammy Baldwin – elected 2012, lesbian, representing Wisconsin
U.S. senator (out when first elected), first openly bisexual member of the U.S. Senate – Kyrsten Sinema – elected 2018, representing Arizona

By state delegation
 Arizona:
 Rep. Jim Kolbe (R) – served 1985–2007; outed in 1996
 Rep. Kyrsten Sinema (D) – served 2013–2019; out when elected
 Sen. Kyrsten Sinema (D) – elected 2018; out when elected
 California:
 Rep. Mark Takano (D) – elected 2012; out when elected 
 Colorado:
 Rep. Jared Polis (D) – served 2009–2019; out when elected
 Florida:
 Rep. Mark Foley (R) – served 1995–2006; outed in 2006
Kansas:
 Rep. Sharice Davids (D) – elected 2018; out when elected
 Maine:
 Rep. Mike Michaud (D) – served 2003–2015; came out in 2014
 Maryland:
 Rep. Robert Bauman (R) – served 1973–1981; outed in 1980
 Massachusetts:
 Rep. Gerry Studds (D) – served 1973–1997; outed in 1983
 Rep. Barney Frank (D) – served 1980–2013; came out in 1987
 Minnesota:
 Rep. Angie Craig (D) – elected 2018; out when elected
 Mississippi:
 Rep. Jon Hinson (R) – served 1979–1981; outed in 1981
 New Hampshire:
Rep. Chris Pappas (D) – elected 2018; out when elected
 New York:
 Rep. Mondaire Jones (D) – elected 2020; out when elected
Rep. Sean Patrick Maloney (D) – elected 2012; out when elected
Rep. Ritchie Torres (D) – elected 2020; out when elected
 Rhode Island:
 Rep. David Cicilline (D) – elected 2010; out when elected
 Vermont:
 Rep. Becca Balint (D) – elected 2022; out when elected
 Wisconsin:
Sen. Tammy Baldwin (D) – elected 2012; out when elected
Rep. Tammy Baldwin (D) – served 1999–2013; out when elected
Rep. Steve Gunderson (R) – served 1981–1997; came out in 1994
Rep. Mark Pocan (D) – elected 2012; out when elected

Executive

Donald Trump was the first President to appoint an open member of the LGBT community to an acting position in the Presidential Cabinet, by making Richard Grenell the acting director of National Intelligence. Grenell's position was never put forward for Senate confirmation, and he served in that role for only three months. Pete Buttigieg was nominated by Joe Biden for the position of Secretary of Transportation and became the first openly LGBT Senate-confirmed Cabinet member following his confirmation on February 2, 2021.

First openly LGBT person appointed to a federal position requiring confirmation by the United States Senate: Roberta Achtenberg, as assistant secretary for fair housing and equal opportunity at the U.S. Department of Housing and Urban Development (1993) She later became a commissioner for the United States Commission on Civil Rights in 2011. 
 First openly LGBT Cabinet Secretary: Pete Buttigieg (2021–present)
 Ambassador: James Hormel (served 1999–2001 in Luxembourg)

Cabinet level official: Richard Grenell (2020) – Director of National Intelligence (acting, was never confirmed or put up for confirmation)
Head of a federal agency: John Berry (2009–2013) – Director of the Office of Personnel Management 
United States marshal: Sharon Lubinski (2009–2016) – U.S. marshal for the District of Minnesota
 United States attorney: Jenny Durkan (2009–2014) – U.S. attorney for the Western District of Washington
 Commissioner of the Equal Employment Opportunity Commission: Chai Feldblum (2010)
Secretary of the Army: Eric Fanning – appointed 2016

State

Overall firsts
First openly lesbian or gay candidate elected to a state legislature – Elaine Noble (D), Massachusetts House of Representatives; Elected in 1974, served two terms starting in January 1975, open when elected.
First openly transgender state legislator – Althea Garrison (R) was elected to the Massachusetts House of Representatives in 1992 but was involuntarily outed after her election, served from 1993 to 1995
First openly gay president of a city council – Harry Britt, President of the San Francisco City-County Board of Supervisors from 1989 to 1990.
First openly gay state comptroller – Ed Flanagan (D), Vermont Auditor of Accounts; served four terms: first elected 1992, came out in 1995; was subsequently reelected. 
First openly gay governor – Jim McGreevey (D), governor of New Jersey – came out 2004 (during the same speech in which he announced his resignation as governor).
First openly gay governor elected – Jared Polis (D), was elected Governor of Colorado November 6, 2018 and married on September 15, 2021, while in office. (McGreevey was not out at the time of election)
First openly bisexual governor and first person to be openly LGBT at time of taking office as governor – Kate Brown (D), governor of Oregon (ascended to office in 2015 after previous governor resigned, then elected in 2016 in her own right).
Lieutenant governor – Josh Tenorio (D), Guam – elected 2018
Secretary of State – Tony Miller (D), California – appointed in 1994; lost election in 1994
State treasurer – Dale McCormick (D), Maine – elected (by the legislature) 1996
State Corporation Commission – Jim Roth (D), Oklahoma – appointed in 2007, lost election for remainder of term in 2009
First openly gay attorney general – Maura Healey (D), Massachusetts, elected in 2014 
First openly lesbian governor elected- Maura Healey (D), Massachusetts, elected in 2022
State legislative leaders:
Presiding officer: Minnesota sen. Allan H. Spear (D) – elected senate president 1993
Speaker: Rhode Island rep. Gordon D. Fox (D) – elected speaker 2010

State officers by state

Constitutional officers 
 Arizona:
 Attorney general: Kris Mayes (D) – elected 2022 
 California:
 State insurance commissioner Ricardo Lara (D) – elected 2018
 Connecticut:
 State comptroller: Kevin Lembo (D) – elected 2010
 Michigan:
 Attorney general: Dana Nessel (D) – elected 2018
 Oregon:
 Secretary of State: Kate Brown (D) – elected 2008

Legislative officials
 California:
 Senate President pro Tempore: Sen. Toni Atkins (D) - elected 2018
 House speaker: Rep. John Pérez (D) – elected 2010
 Colorado:
 House speaker: Mark Ferrandino (D) (2012)
 House minority leader: Mark Ferrandino (D) (2011)
Hawaii:
 House majority leader: Rep. Blake Oshiro (D) – elected 2008, came out 2010
 Maine
 House Speaker: Rep. Ryan Fecteau (D) – elected 2020
 Massachusetts
 Senate minority leader: Sen. Richard Tisei (R) – elected 2007, came out 2010
 Senate majority leader: Sen. Stan Rosenberg (D) – elected 2013, came out 2009
 Minnesota:
 Senate president: Sen. Allan Spear (D) (1993)
 Missouri:
 Senate minority floor leader: Sen. Jolie Justus (D) (2012)
 Oregon:
 Senate minority leader: Sen. Kate Brown (D) (1998)
 Senate majority leader: Sen. Kate Brown (D) (2003)
 House speaker: Rep. Tina Kotek (D) – America's first openly lesbian House speaker (elected as Oregon's House speaker in 2012)
 Rhode Island:
 House speaker: Rep. Gordon D. Fox (D) (2010)
 Vermont:
 President pro tempore: Sen. Becca Balint (D) (2021)
 Washington:
 Senate minority leader: Sen. Ed Murray (D) (2012)
 Wyoming:
 House minority leader: Rep. Cathy Connolly (D) (2016)

State legislators
As of the 2020 elections, the legislatures of 48 states have had at least one openly LGBT member; the first out person to serve in each of those states is listed here. The sole remaining states that have never had an openly LGBT state legislator are Mississippi and Louisiana; Mississippi has, however, had legislators who came out as gay after the end of their term in the legislature, or were outed after their deaths.

 Alabama:
 Rep. Patricia Todd (D) – elected 2006 (female)
 Rep. Neil Rafferty (D) – elected 2018 (male)
 Alaska:
 Rep. Johnny Ellis (D) – elected 1986, came out 2016
 Arizona:
 Ken Cheuvront (D) – served in both the Arizona House of Representatives and the Arizona Senate between 1994 and 2010 (male)
 Paula Aboud (D) – elected to the Arizona Senate in 2006 (female)
 Arkansas:
 Rep. Kathy Webb (D) – elected 2006
 California:
 Assemblywoman (later Sen.) Sheila Kuehl (D) – elected 1994 to House; elected to Senate in 2000 – California's first openly gay state legislator
 The 2004 elections in California sent six openly LGBT people to the California State Legislature: four lesbians (Assemblywoman Jackie Goldberg, Senator Sheila Kuehl, and Senator Carole Migden, Senator Christine Kehoe), and two gay men (Assemblyman Mark Leno and Assemblyman John Laird).
 Rep. John Pérez (D) – first openly LGBT person to serve as speaker of the California State Assembly (appointed 2010) Pérez was succeeded as speaker by Assemblywoman Toni G. Atkins (D)  (elected 2014), the second openly LGBT person (and the first lesbian) to hold the post.

 Colorado General Assembly:
 Rep. (later Sen.) Jennifer Veiga ((D) – Elected to the state House in 1996; became Colorado's first openly LGBT state legislature when she came out in 2002; subsequently reelected and served as House minority leader in 2003 (first LGBT person to hold this post); later elected to the state Senate.
 Rep. Mark Ferrandino (D) – appointed October 2007, became first openly gay man to serve in the General Assembly. In 2012, Ferrandino became Colorado's first openly LGBT speaker of the Colorado House of Representatives. 
 Sen. Lucía Guzmán (D) –elected 2010; first LGBT person to serve as president pro tem of the Colorado Senate
 In 2012, the first major state race in which both major-party candidates were LGBT occurred when Pat Steadman (D) and Michael Carr (R) ran against each other in Colorado's 31st state Senate district.
 Rep. Leslie Herod (D) – elected 2016; first LGBT African-American to be elected to Colorado's state legislature.
Rep. Brianna Titone (D) – elected 2018; first openly transgender woman to be elected to Colorado's state legislature.
 Connecticut General Assembly:
 Rep. Joseph Grabarz (D) – Connecticut's first openly LGBT state legislator; first elected in 1988; came out in December 1990.
 Rep. Evelyn Mantilla (D) – came out as America's first openly bisexual state official in 1997.
 Delaware:
 Sen. Karen E. Peterson (D) – came out 2013
Sen. Sarah McBride (D) – first openly transgender state senator
 Florida:
 Rep. David Richardson (D) and Rep. Joe Saunders (D) – first openly gay Florida state legislators, both elected in 2012
 Georgia:
 Rep. Karla Drenner (female) (D) – elected 2000
 Rep. Rashad Taylor (male) (D) – elected 2008, came out 2011
 Rep. Sam Park (male) (D) – elected 2016
 Hawaii:
 Rep. Joe Bertram (male) (D) – elected 2006
 Rep. Georgette Jo Jordan (female) (Dem) – appointed January 2011; elected November 2012
 Rep. Blake Oshiro (D) – first House majority leader, came out 2010
 Idaho:
 Female: Rep. (later Sen.) Nicole LeFavour (D) – elected 2004
 Male: Rep. John McCrostie (D) – elected 2014
 Illinois:
 Rep. Larry McKeon (male) (D) – elected 1996
 Rep. Deb Mell (female) (D) – elected 2009
 Sen. Mike Simmons (male) (D) – appointed 2021
Indiana:
 Sen. J. D. Ford (male) (D) – elected 2018 
 Iowa:
 Male: Sen. Matt McCoy (D) – came out 2001
 Female: Rep. Liz Bennett (D) – elected 2014
 Norman Jesse and Dan Johnston, who were first elected to the state house in 1967, were not out during their careers in politics, but came out in retirement and revealed that they had been a couple.
 Kansas:
 Susan Ruiz (female) (D) – elected 2018
 Brandon Woodard (male) (D) – elected 2018
Rep Stephanie Byers (D) – elected 2020; first openly transgender person to serve in the Kansas Legislature; first transgender Native American person elected to public office.
 Kentucky:
 Sen. Ernesto Scorsone (D) – came out 2003
 Maine:
 Sen. Dale McCormick (D) – elected 1990
 Maryland:
 Del. Maggie McIntosh (D) – came out 2001
 Del. Richard Madaleno (D) – elected 2002
Massachusetts:
 Rep. Elaine Noble (D) – elected 1974
 Rep. (later Sen.) Jarrett Barrios (D) – elected to House 1999, elected to Senate 2003
 Rep. Althea Garrison (R) – elected 1993, first transgender person elected to a state legislature in the United States.
 Sen. Cheryl Jacques (D) – elected 1993
 Michigan:
 Rep. Chris Kolb (D) – elected 2000
 Rep. Noah Arbit (D) – elected 2022
 Minnesota:
 Sen. Allan Spear (D) – elected 1972, came out December 1974
 Rep. Erin Maye Quade (D) – elected in 2016, ran for lieutenant governor with Erin Murphy in 2018 and is the first LGBTQ person to be endorsed on the ticket of a major Minnesota political party
 Rep. Karen Clark (D) – elected 1981, out when first elected and was the longest serving openly lesbian member to serve in a state legislature in the United States
 Sen. Paul Koering (R) – elected 2002; came out 2005; re-elected in 2006
 Sen. Scott Dibble (D) – elected in 2000, out when first elected
 Rep. Susan Allen (D) – elected in 2012, out when first elected and first openly lesbian Native American woman to win office in any state legislature
 Missouri:
 Rep. Tim Van Zandt (D) – elected 1994; first openly gay person elected to the Missouri House of Representatives
 Rep. Jeanette Oxford (D) – elected 2004; first openly gay woman in the Missouri House of Representatives
 Rep. Zachary Wyatt (R) – elected 2010; came out 2012 and first openly gay republican in the Missouri House of Representatives
 Rep. Tom Hannegan (R) - elected 2016; out when first elected and first openly gay when elected republican in the Missouri House of Representatives
 Sen. Jolie Justus (D) – elected 2007; first openly gay person elected to the Missouri Senate
 Rep. Randy D. Dunn (D) - elected 2012; first openly gay african american in the Missouri House of Representatives
 Rep. Ashley Bland Manlove (D) - elected 2018; first openly gay african american woman in the Missouri House of Representatives
 Sen. Greg Razer (D) - elected 2020; first openly gay man elected to the Missouri Senate
 Montana:
 Rep. Diane Sands (D) – appointed 1996
 Rep. Bryce Bennett (D) – elected 2010
 Nebraska:
 Senator Megan Hunt – elected 2018 (first openly bisexual person ever elected to the Nebraska Legislature)
 Nevada:
 Assemblyman (now Sen.) David Parks (D) (male) – elected 1996
 Senator Patricia Spearman (female) (D) – elected 2012
 New Hampshire:
 Rep. Raymond Buckley (male) (D) – elected 1986
 Rep. Marlene DeChane (female) (D) – elected 1994
 Sen. David Pierce (D) – elected 2012, first open LGBT person ever elected to the New Hampshire Senate
 Chris Pappas (D) – elected 2012, first LGBT person ever elected to the New Hampshire Executive Council
 Sen. Dan Innis (male) (R) – elected 2016, first Republican open LGBT person ever elected to the New Hampshire Senate 
Reps. Gerri Cannon and Lisa Bunker (D)  – elected 2018, first openly transgender people ever seated in the New Hampshire House of Representatives
 New Jersey:
 Assemblyman Reed Gusciora (D) – came out 2006
 New Mexico:
 Sen. Liz Stefanics (female) (D) – elected 1992
 Sen. Jacob Candelaria (male) (D) – elected 2012
 New York:
 Rep. Deborah Glick (female) (D) – elected 1990, first openly lesbian or gay person elected to the NY State Legislature
 Sen. Thomas Duane (male) (D) – elected 1998, first openly gay and/or HIV positive person elected to the NY State Senate
 Rep. Daniel J. O'Donnell (male) (D) — elected 2002
 Rep. Micah Kellner (male; bisexual) (D) – elected 2007
 Rep. Harry Bronson (male) (D) – elected 2010, first LGBT legislator elected from upstate New York
 Sen. Jabari Brisport (male) (D) — elected 2020, first gay male legislator of Black African ancestry and from Brooklyn elected to NY Legislature 
 North Carolina:
 Sen. Julia Boseman (D) – elected 2004
 Rep. Marcus Brandon (male) (D) – elected 2010
 North Dakota:
 Rep. Joshua Boschee (D) – elected 2012
 Ohio:
 Rep. Nickie Antonio (D) – elected 2010
 Rep. Tim Brown (R) – elected 2012
 Oklahoma:
 Rep. (then Sen.) Al McAffrey (male) (D) – elected 2006; elected first state senator 2012
 Rep. Kay Floyd (female) (D) – elected 2012
Rep. Mauree Turner (D) - elected 2020, first openly Non-Binary state legislator in the United States.
 Oregon:
 Rep. Gail Shibley (female) D) – appointed 1991; elected 1992
 Rep. George Eighmey (male) (D) – appointed 1993; elected 1994
 Rep. Chuck Carpenter (R) – elected 1994, first openly gay Republican legislator in the nation
 Rep. Kate Brown (female; bisexual) (D) – appointed 1991; elected 1992, 1994
 Sen. Kate Brown (female; bisexual) (D) – elected 1996
 Rep. Tina Kotek (female) (D) – elected 2006; first openly lesbian Speaker of the House
 Pennsylvania:
 Rep. Mike Fleck (R) – elected 2007, came out 2012
 Rep. Brian Sims (D) – elected (while out) 2012
 Sen. Jim Ferlo (D) – came out 2014
 Rep. Malcolm Kenyatta (D), first gay person of color to serve in either house of the Pennsylvania state legislature.
 Rhode Island:
 Sen. William P. Fitzpatrick (male) (D) – elected 1992, ran as openly gay; statewide publicity after election
 Rep. Mike Pisaturo (male) (D) – elected 1996
 Rep. Nancy Hetherington (female) (D) – elected 1994, came out in 2001
 Sen. Donna Nesselbush (female) (D) – elected 2010
 South Dakota:
 Sen. Angie Buhl (D) (bisexual) – elected 2011, came out 2012
 South Carolina:
 Rep. Jason Elliott (R) (male) – elected 2016
Tennessee:
 Rep. Torrey Harris (D) – elected 2020
Rep. Eddie Mannis (R) – elected 2020
 Texas:
 Rep. Glen Maxey (male) (D) – elected 1991
 Rep. Mary Gonzalez (female) (D) – elected 2012; first openly pansexual elected official in the United States
 Utah:
 Rep. Jackie Biskupski (female) (D) – elected 1998
 Sen. Scott McCoy (male) (D) – elected 2005
 Vermont:
 Rep. Ron Squires (D) – elected 1990
 Rep. Suzi Wizowaty (D) – elected 2008
 Sen. Ed Flanagan (D) – elected 2005
Rep. Taylor Small (D, Progressive) – elected 2020; first openly transgender Vermont legislator
 Virginia:
 Del. (now Sen.) Adam Ebbin (D) – elected 2003; elected first state senator 2011
 Del. Dawn Adams (female; lesbian) (D) – elected 2017
 Del. Danica Roem (D) – elected 2017; first openly transgender person to be elected to a state legislature in the United States.
 Del. Joshua G. Cole (D) – elected 2019; first LGBT person of color and first openly bisexual legislator in VA
 Washington State:
 Rep. (later Sen.) Cal Anderson (D) – appointed 1987
 Rep. Laurie Jinkins (female) (D) – elected 2010
 West Virginia:
 Rep. Stephen Skinner (D) – elected 2012
 Wisconsin:
 Rep. (later Sen.) Tim Carpenter (D) – elected to Assembly in 1984, came out in 2001, elected to Senate in 2002
 Rep. (later U.S. rep) Mark Pocan (D) – elected 1998
 Rep. (later U.S. sen.) Tammy Baldwin (female; lesbian) (D) – elected 1993
 Rep. JoCasta Zamarripa (female; bisexual) (D) – elected 2010; came out 2012
 Wyoming:
 Rep. Cathy Connolly (D) – elected 2008

Territorial legislators
 District of Columbia
 Jim Graham
 David Catania
 Guam:
 Sen. Benjamin Cruz (D) – elected 2008

Local

Nationwide firsts
First openly gay mayor of a U.S. state capital: David Cicilline, Providence, Rhode Island (2002)
First directly elected openly gay mayor in the U.S.: Gene Ulrich, Bunceton, Missouri (1980)
Largest city (in the country) with an openly lesbian mayor: Lori Lightfoot, Chicago, Illinois (2019) (Formerly held by Annise Parker, Houston, Texas (2009))
Largest city with an openly gay male mayor: Ed Murray, Seattle, Washington (2014)
First openly gay president of a city council: Cathy Woolard, Atlanta City Council President from 2002 to 2004.
First openly transgender mayor: Stu Rasmussen, Silverton, Oregon (2008)
First openly LGBT members of a city council: Nancy Wechsler and Jerry DeGrieck, both elected as members of the Human Rights Party to the Ann Arbor City Council in 1972; both came out in 1973.
First openly gay person (male or female) elected to public office (city council): Kathy Kozachenko, Ann Arbor, Michigan (1974)
First openly gay man elected to a U.S. city council (incumbent): Jim Yeadon, Madison, Wisconsin (1977)
First openly gay or lesbian elected official in California: Harvey Milk, member of the San Francisco Board of Supervisors; elected 1977, assassinated in 1978 by Dan White shortly after White killed Mayor George Moscone.
First openly gay black person elected to public office in the United States: Keith St. John, elected to Albany, New York common council in 1989.
First openly gay Hispanic person elected to public office in the United States: Ricardo Gonzalez, Madison, Wisconsin (1989)
First openly transgender member of a city council: Joanne Conte (Arvada, Colorado) – trans woman, served on Arvada City Council from 1991 to 1995.
First openly bisexual member of a city council: Marlene Pray, joined Doylestown, Pennsylvania, council in 2012, resigned 2013 (also first openly bisexual office holder in Pennsylvania).
First openly gay City Council Speaker: Christine Quinn (elected 2006)
First openly gay married couple to serve elected public office together for the same municipality (Borough Council): Thos Shipley and Joe DeIorio, Roselle Park, New Jersey, 2018.

By state
Alaska
Mayor of Anchorage: Austin Quinn-Davidson, 2020
Arizona
Tempe
Mayor: Neil Giuliano, 1994–2004
California
Ron Galperin was the first openly gay citywide elected official in Los Angeles when he was elected City Controller in 2013. Galperin was re-elected to a second term in 2017.
Robert F. Gentry was elected mayor of Laguna Beach, in 1982, becoming the first openly gay mayor in California and the first openly gay elected official in southern California.
John Laird was elected mayor of Santa Cruz in 1983.
Danny Wan was appointed member of the Oakland City Council in 1999, and elected in the post in 2002, becoming the city's first openly gay politician.
Ron Oden was elected mayor of Palm Springs in 2003; he became the first openly gay black man elected mayor of an American city and was the first openly gay mayor of Palm Springs.
Mike Gin was elected mayor of Redondo Beach in 2005, becoming the first openly gay Asian-American mayor elected in the US and the first Republican gay mayor elected in California.
Todd Gloria was elected mayor of San Diego in 2020, becoming the first gay and first person of color to serve as mayor of the 8th largest city in America as well as the first Native American and Filipino-American to serve as mayor of a city of more than one million people.
Christopher Cabaldon was elected mayor of West Sacramento in 1998 and came out in 2006, making him the first openly gay Filipino elected as mayor in the US. As of 2016, he is the longest-serving LGBT mayor.
Evan Low was elected mayor of Campbell in 2009, at the age 26, making him the youngest gay mayor (and the youngest Asian-American mayor) nationwide at the time. Low was reelected in 2013.
Joe Mosca took office as mayor of Sierra Madre in 2010, becoming the first openly gay mayor in the San Gabriel Valley. By 2010, there were four openly gay mayors in Los Angeles County: Mosca, John Heilman of West Hollywood, Mitch Ward of Manhattan Beach, and Mike Gin of Redondo Beach.
Bao Nguyen was elected mayor of Garden Grove, in 2014, at the age 34, making him the first gay mayor and first Vietnamese mayor of Garden Grove, as well as the youngest mayor in Orange County. He also became the first Vietnamese Democratic mayor in the United States.
Gerrie Schipske, was elected to Long Beach Community College Board of Trustees, 1992–1996, served as president, and was elected to Long Beach City Council,  2006–2014, in each case becoming the first openly lesbian elected official.
Gary Miller was elected to the Robla Elementary School District Board in 1987 and became the first openly Gay local elected official in Sacramento and Sacramento County.  Miller won re-election many times and served on the board from 1987 to 2006.  Mr Miller was also the first openly Gay local elected official in Placer County where he won a seat on the Roseville City School Board in 2008, won re-election in multiple races, and served until 2020.
Connecticut
Pedro Segarra was the first openly gay mayor of Hartford. Segarra, the former president of the city council, became mayor in 2010 after his predecessor Eddie A. Perez resigned from office. Segarra won a full term in the 2011 election.
 Daryl Justin Finizio was the first openly gay mayor of New London (elected 2011).
Delaware
 The first openly gay elected official was John Brady as Sussex County Register in Chancery(chief clerk of court) in 2000. Brady also served as The Sussex County Recorder of Deeds and Sussex County Clerk of the Peace (Marriage Bureau Chief Official) before retiring after 14 years of Service
The first openly gay mayor in Delaware was John Buchheit of Delaware City (elected 2011).
Florida
Richard A. Heyman – elected mayor of Key West in 1983, becoming the first openly LGBT mayor in Florida and one of the first openly LGBT mayors in the United States (Robert F. Gentry of Laguna Beach, California, and John Laird of Santa Cruz, California, were both elected the same year).
J.P. Sasser – mayor of Pahokee; came out in 2006, while in his third term in office
Ken Keechl – first openly LGBT person to serve on the Broward County Commission (elected 2006), and to serve as vice mayor (2008) and mayor (2009) of Broward County (mayor and vice mayor are chosen by vote on commissioners)
Craig Lowe – first openly LGBT mayor of Gainesville (and of any north Florida city); elected 2010
Teri Johnston – first openly lesbian mayor of Key West and first openly lesbian mayor in Florida in 2018.
Justin Flippen – first openly gay mayor of Wilton Manors in 2018.
Dean Trantalis – first openly gay mayor of Fort Lauderdale in 2018.
Jane Castor – first openly lesbian mayor of Tampa in 2019.
J. Tyler Payne – first openly gay mayor of Treasure Island, Florida in 2021.
Georgia
Cathy Woolard was elected to the Atlanta City Council in 1997, becoming the first openly LGBT elected official in the state of Georgia.  She went on to become council president.
Ben Ku was elected to the Gwinnett County Board of Commissioners in 2018, becoming the first openly LGBT official to be elected to the Gwinnett County Board of Commissioners.  
Hawaii
Tim Riley was elected to the Waianae neighborhood board in February 2019.
Illinois
Lori Lightfoot, was elected Mayor of Chicago in April 2019, making her the first openly gay mayor of Chicago and making Chicago the largest US city ever to elect an openly gay mayor.
Indiana
Pete Buttigieg, first major political party candidate for president; before that mayor of South Bend – publicly announced that he was gay in 2015, while in his first term in office; first openly LGBT executive official in Indiana.
Veronica Pejril – Indiana's first transgender elected official, Greencastle city council, elected 2019.
Iowa
Bill Crews – mayor of Melbourne; came out while in office (reelected 1995)
Kansas
Longest-serving LGBTQ elected official: Henry Schwaller, elected 1999 – city commissioner, Hays, Kansas
Mayor: C.C. Smith (female), elected 2017 – Linn Valley, Kansas
Kansas has six openly-LGBT city councillors/commissioners, including in two of the state's ten biggest cities: Shawnee and Manhattan. 
Kentucky
Lexington
Mayor: Jim Gray
Maine
Geo Soctomah Neptune – elected 2020; first trans, non-binary, and two-spirit person elected to public office in Maine
Massachusetts
Cambridge
Kenneth Reeves (male), elected 1992
E. Denise Simmons (female), elected 2008
Massachusetts
Revere
Steven Morabito (male), elected 2013
E. Denise Simmons (female), elected 2008
Michigan
Ferndale
Mayor: Craig Covey
Minnesota
Minneapolis
Andrea Jenkins elected in 2017, first openly transgender black woman elected to public office in the United States
Phillipe Cunningham elected in 2017, first openly transgender black man elected to a city council in the United States
Mary Moriarty elected 2023, first LGBT Heppenpin County Attorney
 Mississippi
Southaven
Mayor: Greg Davis (came out in 2011)
New Hampshire
 Nashua
 Board of Education: Tim Nickerson, elected 1997, First openly gay person elected at any level in NH.  Others previously elected came out after his election
New Jersey
 Chatham Borough
 Mayor: Bruce Harris, elected 2011
Maywood
 Mayor: Tim Eustace
New Mexico
Santa Fe
Mayor: Javier Gonzales
New York
Eddie Sundquist, elected 2019, is the first openly gay mayor of Jamestown, New York.
North Carolina
Wake County (NC capital county, incl. Raleigh)
Commissioner Greg Ford, first openly gay county commissioner in Wake County and first openly gay board chairman (elected 2019) and vice chairman (elected 2018) in North Carolina. Elected in 2016. Reelected in 2018. 
 Carrboro
 Mayor Michael R. Nelson, elected 1995 (first openly gay mayor elected in NC)
Chapel Hill
 Town councilman Joe Herzenberg, elected 1987 (first openly gay elected official in the South) 
 Mayor Mark Kleinschmidt, elected 2009
Raleigh
 Raleigh city councilman: Saige Martin, elected 2019
Oregon
Portland
Sam Adams
 Silverton
 Stu Rasmussen (transgender)
Pennsylvania
Erie
 Tyler Titus, a transgender man, became the first openly transgender person elected to public office in Pennsylvania when he was elected to the Erie School Board in 2017.
Rhode Island
Providence
Mayor: David Cicilline
Texas
Houston
 Mayor (Major City): Annise Parker, elected 2009, assumed office January 2010
Kemp
 Mayor (Any City): Matthew Ganssle, elected 2009, assumed office May 2009
New Hope
 Mayor: Jess Herbst, appointed 2016, came out as transgender 2017
Utah
Willy Marshall, a member of the Libertarian Party, became the first openly gay mayor in Utah when he was elected mayor of Big Water in 2001.
Virginia
Jay Fisette, elected member of Arlington County Board, Virginia, as openly gay in 1997. Served until 2017.
Joel McDonald, member of the Virginia Beach School Board, elected 2012. First openly gay candidate to be elected in Hampton Roads.
Lawrence Webb, elected member of Falls Church City School Board, Virginia. First openly gay elected African American in Virginia in 2008 to Falls Church City Council.  Current member of the Falls Church City School Board.
Washington
Seattle
Mayor: Ed Murray (male)
Mayor: Jenny Durkan (female)
Wisconsin
Satya Rhodes-Conway – mayor of Madison.

Judicial
The first openly gay judge in the United States was Stephen M. Lachs, appointed by Governor Jerry Brown to the Los Angeles County Superior Court in 1979. Before leaving office in 1981, Brown appointed three more gay and lesbian judges to the California courts, including the nation's first openly lesbian judge, Mary Morgan, who served on the San Francisco municipal court.

In 1994, Thomas R. Chiola became the first openly gay judge in Illinois (and the first openly gay elected official in Illinois) when voters elected him to the Circuit Court of Cook County.

Deborah Batts was the nation's first openly LGBT federal judge. She was appointed by President Bill Clinton to the U.S. District Court for the Southern District of New York and confirmed by the Senate in a voice vote in 1994. (Judge Vaughn Walker of the Northern District of California served from 1989 to February 2011 but did not come out until April 2011, after his retirement.)

Batts was the sole openly LGBT judge on the federal bench for seventeen years, until Barack Obama appointed a series of gay and lesbian judges to the district courts: J. Paul Oetken (Southern District of New York, 2011); Alison J. Nathan (Southern District of New York, 2011); Michael W. Fitzgerald (Central District of California, 2012); Nitza I. Quiñones Alejandro (Eastern District of Pennsylvania, 2013); Pamela K. Chen (Eastern District of New York, 2013); Michael J. McShane (District of Oregon, 2013); Darrin P. Gayles (Southern District of Florida, 2014); Staci Michelle Yandle (Southern District of Illinois, 2014), and Judith Ellen Levy (Eastern District of Michigan, 2014).

Obama also appointed the first openly LGBT judge of a federal court of appeals, Todd M. Hughes of the United States Court of Appeals for the Federal Circuit.

The first openly LGBT justice of a state supreme court was Rives Kistler, appointed to the Oregon Supreme Court in 2003, and retained by voters the following year. The next gay or lesbian state supreme court justices were Virginia Linder (Oregon Supreme Court, 2006); Monica Márquez (Colorado Supreme Court, 2010); Barbara Lenk (Massachusetts Supreme Judicial Court, 2011); Sabrina McKenna (Supreme Court of Hawaii, 2011); Beth Robinson (Vermont Supreme Court, 2011). In 2017, Paul Feinman became the first openly gay judge to sit on the New York Court of Appeals.

Benjamin Cruz of Guam was the first openly gay judge of a territorial supreme court; he came out in 1995 and was appointed to the  Supreme Court of Guam in 1997. Cruz served as associate justice from 1997 to 1999 and as chief justice from 1999 until his retirement in 2001.

The first openly bisexual judge in the United States is Mike Jacobs, a state court judge in DeKalb County, Georgia, who came out publicly in 2018.

State judge of compensation claims: Rand Hoch, Flagler, Seminole and Volusia counties, Florida – appointed 1992
Transgender judge: Victoria Kolakowski, Superior Court of Alameda County, California – elected 2010
Superior Court judge Victor Carlson, 3rd Judicial District State of Alaska at Anchorage – appointed 1975 served until 1985 when he lost a retention election that was held in the shadow of his coming out.

See also
 List of LGBT politicians in the United States

References

External links
 

1st
United States
LGBT
LGBT history in the United States
Lists of American LGBT people